Duki may refer to:

People 
 Duki (rapper), Argentine rapper
 Duki Dror (born 1963), Israeli filmmaker

Places 
 Duki, Iran, a village in Zarabad District, Konarak County, Sistan and Baluchestan Province
 Duki, Poland, a village in Gmina Tarczyn, Piaseczno County, Masovian Voivodeship
 Duki District, Pakistan, a district in the Balochistan province of Pakistan
 Duki, another name for Dawki, a town in West Jaintia Hills district, Meghalaya, India

See also 
 Dookie, Victoria, a town in Australia
 Dukie Weems, a fictional character on the HBO drama The Wire, played by Jermaine Crawford